Wang Xiaofu (born November 1988) is a Chinese retired Paralympic swimmer and multiple gold medalist. 

At the age of six, Wang lost his right arm and has impaired muscle strength in his legs following an electrical accident. At the age of 13, he began training for high-level Paralympic swimming, and won three gold medals when he participated in national games the following year. In 2007, he won nine gold medals in national competitions.

Wang represented China at the 2004 Summer Paralympics in Athens, winning three gold medals, a silver and a bronze, and setting three world records in the process. He has represented China again at the 2008 Summer Paralympics in Beijing, and carried his country's flag during the Games' Opening Ceremony.

References

1988 births
Living people
Paralympic swimmers of China
Swimmers at the 2004 Summer Paralympics
Swimmers at the 2008 Summer Paralympics
Paralympic gold medalists for China
Paralympic silver medalists for China
Paralympic bronze medalists for China
World record holders in paralympic swimming
Chinese amputees
Swimmers from Yunnan
Medalists at the 2008 Summer Paralympics
Medalists at the 2004 Summer Paralympics
S8-classified Paralympic swimmers
Paralympic medalists in swimming
Chinese male freestyle swimmers
Chinese male breaststroke swimmers
Chinese male butterfly swimmers
Chinese male medley swimmers
Medalists at the World Para Swimming Championships